Fucha Peak is the peak rising to 2604 m in the central part of Bangey Heights, north-central Sentinel Range in Ellsworth Mountains, Antarctica.  It surmounts Marsa Glacier to the west and Padala Glacier to the southeast.

The peak is named after the settlements of Mala (Little) Fucha and Golema (Great) Fucha in Western Bulgaria.

Location
US mapping in 1961, updated in 1988.

See also
 Mountains in Antarctica

Maps
 Vinson Massif.  Scale 1:250 000 topographic map.  Reston, Virginia: US Geological Survey, 1988.
 Antarctic Digital Database (ADD). Scale 1:250000 topographic map of Antarctica. Scientific Committee on Antarctic Research (SCAR). Since 1993, regularly updated.

Notes

External links
 Fuchs Peak. SCAR Composite Antarctic Gazetteer.
 Bulgarian Antarctic Gazetteer. Antarctic Place-names Commission. (details in Bulgarian, basic data in English)

External links
 Fucha Peak. Copernix satellite image

Bulgaria and the Antarctic
Ellsworth Mountains
Mountains of Ellsworth Land